The International Association for Cross-Cultural Psychology (IACCP) is an international learned society dedicated to advancing research in cross-cultural psychology, and to facilitating communication among researchers in the field. It was founded in 1972 in Hong Kong. As of 2016, it was based at the Florida Institute of Technology in Melbourne, Florida. As of 2018, it has over 800 members from over 65 different countries. It is affiliated with the International Union of Psychological Science and the International Association of Applied Psychology. The Journal of Cross-Cultural Psychology is published on its behalf by SAGE Publications.

References

External links

Cross-cultural psychology
International learned societies
Psychology organizations based in the United States
Organizations established in 1972
1972 establishments in Hong Kong
Organizations based in Florida